Fact Hunt (2005) is a comedic TV quiz show which originally aired late at night on various ITV regions. It was hosted by Al Murray in character as the Pub Landlord, the character he has long played in stand-up routines and in the sitcom Time Gentlemen Please.

Fact Hunt was originally a section of Al Murray's Edinburgh stage show, where two male members of the audience were called on stage to answer questions. The idea was further developed into a fictional pub quiz machine (and on-going plot device) of the same name from a sitcom starring Al Murray called Time Gentlemen Please. This programme ran for two complete seasons between 2000 and 2002 on Sky One and was the first time Al Murray's Pub landlord character was in a scripted sitcom format.

It wasn't until the success of Al Murray's main ITV show that a further spin off show wholly based on the quiz, which was called Fact Hunt.

References

External links

2000s British game shows
2000s British comedy television series
2005 British television series debuts
2005 British television series endings
ITV comedy
ITV game shows
Television series by ITV Studios